The year 2010 is the second year in the history of BAMMA, a mixed martial arts promotion based in the United Kingdom. In 2010 BAMMA held 3 events beginning with, BAMMA 2: Roundhouses at the Roundhouse.

Title fights

Events list

BAMMA 2: Roundhouses at the Roundhouse

BAMMA 2: Roundhouses at the Roundhouse was an event held on February 13, 2010 at The Roundhouse in London, England, United Kingdom.

Results

BAMMA 3: Horwich vs. Watson

BAMMA 3: Horwich vs. Watson was an event held on May 15, 2010 at the LG Arena in Birmingham, England, United Kingdom.

Results

BAMMA 4: Reid vs. Watson

BAMMA 4: Reid vs. Watson was an event held on September 25, 2010 at the National Indoor Arena in Birmingham, England, United Kingdom.

Results

References

BAMMA events
2010 in mixed martial arts